Ghodratollah Alikhani is an Iranian Shi'a cleric and reformist politician who formerly represented Qazvin Province constituencies in the Parliament of Iran.

References

1939 births
Living people
Iranian Shia clerics
People from Takestan
Members of the 6th Islamic Consultative Assembly
Members of the 7th Islamic Consultative Assembly
Members of the 8th Islamic Consultative Assembly
Association of Combatant Clerics politicians